From Nowhere to the North Pole is an 1875 children's novel by English author Tom Hood. Hood's book was one of the many Alice in Wonderland imitations published in the 19th century. In it the hero Frank has many strange adventures after falling asleep full of plum cake.

Gallery

Notes

Further reading
 Salmon, Edward (1887). "Literature for the Little Ones", The Nineteenth Century, Vol. XXII, pp. 563–580.
 Susina, Jan (2010). "Imitations of Alice: Lewis Carroll and the Anxiety of Influence." In: The Place of Lewis Carroll in Children's Literature. New York: Routledge.

External links
 From Nowhere to the North Pole, at Internet Archive

1875 British novels
1870s children's books
Books based on Alice in Wonderland
Victorian novels
Novels set in the 19th century
British children's novels